The 2013 Nadeshiko League season was won by INAC Kobe Leonessa, who defended their 2012 title.

Nadeshiko League (Division 1)

Result

League awards

Best player

Top scorers

Best eleven

Best young player

Challenge League (Division 2)

Result

 Best Player: Akari Shiraki, Tokiwagi Gakuen High School L.S.C.
 Top scorers: Hitomi Mori, Sfida Setagaya F.C.
 Best young player: Rikako Kobayashi, Tokiwagi Gakuen High School L.S.C.

Promotion/relegation series

Division 1 promotion/relegation series

F.C. Kibi International University Charme stay Division 1 in 2014 Season.
Sfida Setagaya F.C. stay Division 2 in 2014 Season.

Division 2 Promotion series

Qualifiers Block A

Qualifiers Block B

Final

AS Harima ALBION Promoted for Division 2 in 2014 Season. 
Angeviolet Hiroshima play to Division 2 promotion/relegation Series.

Division 2 promotion/relegation series

Angeviolet Hiroshima Promoted for Division 2 in 2014 Season. 
Je Vrille Kagoshima Relegated to Regional League (Kyushu, Q League) in 2014 Season.

See also
Empress's Cup

References

External links
 Nadeshiko League Official Site
Season at soccerway.com

Nadeshiko League seasons
1
L
Japan
Japan